Emily Biwott (born 1984) is a female long-distance runner from Kenya.

Achievements

References

1984 births
Living people
Kenyan female long-distance runners
21st-century Kenyan women